{{Infobox television
| image                = Inocentedeti-poster.jpg
| num_episodes         = 130
| genre                = TelenovelaRomanceDrama
| creator              = Inés Rodena
| writer               = Carlos RomeroTere MedinaJulio Gaibay
| starring             = Valentino LanúsCamila SodiHelena RojoCarolina TejeraLupita Ferrer
| opentheme            = Algo Más by La Quinta EstacionInocente de Ti by Juan Gabriel
| endtheme             =
| theme_music_composer = 
| language             = Spanish
| country              = Mexico
| runtime              = 42-45 minutes
| company              = Televisa
| distributor          = Televisa
| location             = FilmingTelevisa San Ángel Mexico City, Mexico  LocationsMexico City, Mexico  Miami, United States
| channel              = Canal de las EstrellasUnivision
| audio_format         = 
| picture_format       = NTSC
| first_aired          = 
| last_aired           = 
| executive_producer   = Nathalie Lartilleux
| producer             = Alfredo SchwarzSalvador Mejía
| director             = Miguel CórcegaLeonardo DanielVíctor Manuel Fouilloux
| cinematography       = 
| camera               = Multi-camera
| editor               = 
| preceded_by          = Amar otra vez
| followed_by          = Piel de otoño
| related              = La italianita (1972)Rina (1977)Rubí rebelde (1989)   María Mercedes (1992-1993)Maria Esperança (2007)María Mercedes (2013)Inocente de Ti (2016) 
}}Inocente de Ti (Lit. Title: Innocent of you /English title: Pure Innocence) is a Mexican telenovela produced by Nathalie Lartilleux for Televisa in 2004.

On Monday, November 8, 2004, Canal de las Estrellas began to broadcast Inocente de Ti on weekdays at 5:00pm, to replace Amar otra vez. The last episode of Inocente de Ti was broadcast on Friday, May 6, 2005, and Piel de otoño replaced it the following day.

Camila Sodi and Valentino Lanús starred as protagonists, while Helena Rojo and Carolina Tejera starred as antagonists. Lupita Ferrer and Ricardo Blume starred as stellar performances.

Plot
Flor (also referred to as Florecita) travels from Mexico to USA, with her grandmother Clotilde and her sister Isela, in order for the girls to reunite with their father, Ruben, and two brothers, Rodrigo and Victor, who live in Miami.

During the trip, Clotilde dies in the desert. The girls bury their grandmother in the desert and continue to Miami, only to find out that their father is an alcoholic.

Flor's mother, Gabriela, lives in Miami, although her children believe her to be dead. Gabriela has remarried, and is now a famous television director. One day Florecita and Gabriela meet without recognizing each other.

Flor begins to work right away, selling flowers on the street and cleaning cars. One day, she meets Julio Alberto and his girlfriend Gloria, who are preparing for their wedding. Julio Alberto buys Gloria a flower from Flor.

Gloria dies at the wedding, and Julio Alberto is overwhelmed with grief. After a while, he starts to spend time in the park where he and Gloria walked together and where they used to be so happy. He sometimes sees Flor and starts talking to her.

Julio Alberto's mother, Rebeca, lives with her three children in the house of her twin sister Raquel. The sisters hate each other and Rebeca is silently waiting Raquel's death from cancer.

Raquel plans to leave her fortune to Flor, so that Rebeca doesn't get a penny; when the will is read, Rebeca is furious.

Believing that money is rightfully hers, she makes her son seduce Flor, and comes up with a plan to steal the money from the young girl and throw her out on the streets.

Flor doesn't care about losing her fortune because she was never rich in the first place, but she is disappointed that Julio Alberto lied to her and betrayed her, and she believed in him.

She decides to find a job as a maid, with the Dalmacci family, where Sergio, the trouble-making son, falls in love with Flor, fascinated by the goodness of her heart.

Then Julio Alberto re-enters Flor's life, realizing that he is truly in love with her. He begs Flor to forgive him and return to him. Whom does her heart belong to now? Is it Julio Alberto or Sergio?

Cast
 
Camila Sodi as Flor de María "Florecita" González de CastilloValentino Lanús as Julio Alberto Castillo Linares-RoblesHelena Rojo as Rebeca Linares-Robles Vda. de Castillo/Raquel Linares-RoblesLupita Ferrer as Gabriela SmithCarolina Tejera as Nuria Zaval MonteroLuis José Santander as Sergio Dalmacci RiondaKarla Álvarez as AuroraRicardo Blume as Armando DalmacciKarla Monroig as Gloria del JuncoAltair Jarabo as Isela González de CastilloAbraham Ramos as Efraín Castillo Linares-RoblesKatie Barberi as Mayte DalmacciToño Mauri as Sebastián RiondaSalvador Pineda as Rubén GonzálezAlma Delfina as LupeVirna Flores as Virginia Castillo Linares-RoblesMiguel Córcega as Lic. Mauricio RiverollPatricia Reyes Spíndola as Grandmother CleotildeAriel López Padilla as Lic. Gómez RiverollDayana Garroz as Gladis SolerLeonardo Daniel as FilemónYul Bürkle as DouglasEleazar Gómez as Víctor GonzálezMiguel Loyo as Rodrigo GonzálezIlithya Manzanilla as Mónica DalmacciMarita Capote as CoromotoElodia Riovega as Chalia #1María Piñeiro as Chalia #2Manolo Coego as ZacaríasMarisela Buitriago as FeFred Valle as William SmithEddie Nava as MiguelPilar Hurtado as Carmela GonzálezCatalina Mesa as VioletaJuan Carlos Gutiérrez as AztecaJorge Luis Pascual as OmarAriel Díaz as ManoloCarlos Yustis as CándidoIrene López as GemaNéstor Emmanuel as PorfirioMichael Scalli as BenignoTania Vázquez as PilarHarry Geithner as GustavoJorge Van Rankin as Pepe ToñoIsmael La Rosa as GilbertoCarlos Mesber as GenaroArianna Coltelacci as María del Socorro GarcíaValerie Peshuta as Teresita Rionda DalmacciCarlos Riestra as MayitoJosé Bardina as ArmandoDaniel Dhoy as RogelioCarlos Farach as Dr. ValdezJustin Bell as La migra''

Awards

References

External links

2004 telenovelas
Mexican telenovelas
2004 Mexican television series debuts
2004 American television series debuts
2005 Mexican television series endings
2005 American television series endings
Spanish-language telenovelas
Television shows set in Mexico City
Spanish-language American telenovelas
Television shows set in Miami
Televisa telenovelas
Univision telenovelas